A Landing On The Sun is a 1991 novel by Michael Frayn, and was the Sunday Express Book of the Year.  It was adapted into a 1994 TV movie with a screenplay written by the author.

Synopsis
Jessel, a British civil servant working in the Cabinet Office, has been asked to investigate the unexplained death of Summerchild, also a civil servant, whose body was found outside the Admiralty some 15 years earlier, in 1974. His investigations reveal that Summerchild was involved in the setting up of a 'Strategy Unit' reporting directly to the Prime Minister Harold Wilson. (The book predates by 10 years the establishment by Tony Blair of his Strategy unit in 2001).

References

External links
 

1991 British novels
Novels by Michael Frayn
Novels set in London
Viking Press books